John Davies (born 1 July 1881) was an English professional footballer. A  forward, he was on the books of Liverpool and Blackpool.

Career
Davies began his career with one of his hometown clubs, Liverpool. He made his debut for the Reds on 9 March 1901. He made nine Football League and one FA Cup appearances for the Anfield club.

In 1903, he moved a short distance up the coast to join Blackpool. He made one League appearance for the Tangerines, in a 2–0 home defeat to Barnsley on 12 September 1903.

References

1881 births
Year of death missing
Footballers from Liverpool
English footballers
Liverpool F.C. players
Blackpool F.C. players
Association football forwards